Elections for London Borough of Waltham Forest were held on 6 May 2010.  The 2010 General Election and other local elections took place on the same day.

In London council elections the entire council is elected every four years, opposed to some local elections where one councillor is elected every year for three of the four years.

After eight years of the council being in no overall control, although governed by Labour, firstly in a minority and latterly in coalition with the Liberal Democrats, Labour regained their overall majority on the council.

Eligibility 

All locally registered electors (British, Irish, Commonwealth and European Union citizens) who were aged 18 or over on Thursday 6 May 2010 were entitled to vote in the local elections. Those who were temporarily away from their ordinary address (for example, away working, on holiday, in student accommodation or in hospital) were also entitled to vote in the local elections, although those who had moved abroad and registered as overseas electors cannot vote in the local elections. It is possible to register to vote at more than one address (such as a university student who had a term-time address and lives at home during holidays) at the discretion of the local Electoral Register Office, but it remains an offence to vote more than once in the same local government election.

Composition before election

Election result

Results by ward

The ward results listed below are based on the changes from the 2006 elections, not taking into account any mid-term by-elections or party defections.

References

2010
2010 London Borough council elections
May 2010 events in the United Kingdom